The Dolans Bay is a cove on the Burraneer Bay adjacent to the lower estuarine Hacking River of Port Hacking in southern Sydney, in the state of New South Wales, Australia.

Location and features
With a catchment that drains a small number of the most southern suburbs of the Sutherland Shire, Dolans Bay is located as a small cover off Burraneer Bay, near where the Hacking River and Port Hacking estuary meet Gunnamatta Bay and empty into Bate Bay. The bay's catchment area is bound by Port Hacking to the south, Buraneer Bay sub-catchment to the east and north, and Little Turnell Bay sub-catchment to the southwest, and Gannons Bay and Great Turnell Bay sub-catchments to the west.

Houses overlook the bay and some line the water's edge together with boatsheds. Boats are moored in the bay, which provides protection from the southerly wind. Burraneer Bay features a private marina and slipway with full repair facilities.  Notable residents that have lived in the area surrounding Dolans Bay include cricket players Ricky Ponting and Glenn McGrath.

Dolans Bay was named after a land owner in the area called Dominick Dolan. In 1858 Mary and Andrew Webster paid 108 pounds and 15 shillings plus a yearly peppercorn quit rent for their land in this area. The Websters sold their land to Dominick Dolan in 1863.

References

Bays of New South Wales